The 2019–20 South Carolina Gamecocks men's basketball team represented the University of South Carolina during the 2019–20 NCAA Division I men's basketball season. The team's head coach, Frank Martin, was in his eighth season at South Carolina. The team played its home games at Colonial Life Arena in Columbia, South Carolina as a member of the Southeastern Conference. They finished the season 18–13, 10–8 in SEC play to finish in a tie for sixth place. They were set to take on Arkansas in the second round of the SEC tournament. However, the remainder of the SEC Tournament and all other postseason tournaments were cancelled amid the COVID-19 pandemic.

Previous season
The Gamecocks finished the 2018–19 season finished the season 16–16, 11–7 in SEC play to finish in a tie for 4th place. As a No. 4 seed in the SEC tournament, they lost in the quarterfinals to Ole Miss.

Offseason

Departures

Incoming transfers

2019 recruiting class

2020 recruiting class

Preseason

SEC media poll
The SEC media poll was released on October 15, 2019.

Roster

Schedule and results

|-
!colspan=12 style=|Exhibition

|-
!colspan=12 style=|Non-conference regular season

|-
!colspan=12 style=| SEC regular season

|-
!colspan=9 style=| SEC tournament
|- style="background:#bbbbbb"
| style="text-align:center"|March 12, 20209:30 pm, SECN
| style="text-align:center"| (6)
| vs. (11) ArkansasSecond round
| colspan=5 rowspan=1 style="text-align:center"|Cancelled due to the COVID-19 pandemic
| style="text-align:center"|Bridgestone ArenaNashville, TN
|-

Source:

References

South Carolina
South Carolina Gamecocks men's basketball seasons
South Carolina Gamecocks men's basketball
South Carolina Gamecocks men's basketball